Stéphane Tardieu (born 16 March 1970) is a French adaptive rower who competes in international elite competitions, he started rowing when he was fourteen before switching to rugby, he went back to rowing in 2007 after losing a leg in a hunting accident two years previously. He competes in the double sculls with his training partner Perle Bouge, they have both won two Paralympic medals and five World medals.

References

External links

1970 births
Living people
Rowers from Paris
French male rowers
Paralympic rowers of France
Rowers at the 2012 Summer Paralympics
Rowers at the 2016 Summer Paralympics
Medalists at the 2012 Summer Paralympics
Medalists at the 2016 Summer Paralympics
World Rowing Championships medalists for France